The KhTZ-16 (after the Kharkiv Tractor Factory) was a Soviet improvised fighting vehicle of the Second World War, built on the chassis of an STZ-3 tractor. The vehicles were built in Kharkiv until the factory was evacuated to the east, at which time production moved to Stalingrad. No less than 809 vehicles were planned, but no more than about 60-90 were actually built. Some vehicles were used in the fighting around Kharkov in October 1941, but were quickly lost in battle against Axis forces. 

The vehicle was operated by a crew of two, and armed with a 45mm anti-tank gun, 37mm anti-aircraft gun and a 7.62mm DT or Degtyarev light machine gun mounted in a fixed superstructure.

See also 
 NI tank
 Kubuś
 Bedford OXA
 Bob Semple tank

References 

 Zaloga, Steven J., James Grandsen (1984). Soviet Tanks and Combat Vehicles of World War Two, p. 142. London: Arms and Armour Press. .

External links

Soviet armored tractors
Kolomiets M. M-Hobby, #3, 1997 "Bronetractors, part III"
 Tanks Encyclopedia provides extensive photographs and substantial information.

World War II tanks of the Soviet Union
Improvised armoured fighting vehicles
World War II armoured fighting vehicles of the Soviet Union